is a House of Lords case concerning the Animals Act 1971.

Facts
Dr Andrew Henley and his wife Susan kept a horse and two ponies in a field next to their house.  On the night of 28–29 August 1996, something frightened the animals, which escaped past a wooden barrier and electrified wire fencing onto a track.  They went 300 yards up the track and about a mile along a minor road, and made their way onto the A380 dual carriageway from Torquay to Exeter.

Shortly after midnight, Hossein Mirvahedy, a hotel manager, who was driving along this road, collided with the largest of the horses.  Mr Mirvahedy suffered serious injuries for which he sought damages in the courts.

Law
The case turned on Section 2(2) of the Animals Act 1971, which reads as follows:-

As Lord Nicholls of Birkenhead noted, "Unfortunately the language of section 2(2) is ... opaque.  In this instance the parliamentary draftsman's zeal for brevity has led to obscurity.  Over the years section 2(2) has attracted much judicial obloquy."

Courts below
In the County Court, Judge O'Malley dismissed Mr Mirvahedy's claim on the grounds that it was not any abnormal or unusual characteristic of the animals that led to the accident.  He found that Dr and Mrs Henley had not been negligent because the fencing would normally have been sufficient to contain the horses.  In the Court of Appeal, Hale LJ, Keene LJ and Dame Elizabeth Butler-Sloss P overturned this and found Dr and Mrs Henley liable.

Judgment
Reviewing the authorities, the Lords identified two possible interpretations of the 1971 Act, which it called the Cummings interpretation and the Breeden interpretation.  In Cummings v Granger 1977 QB 397 an alsatian dog was turned loose in a scrap yard and seriously injured an intruder.  Because the intruder was trespassing the dog owner escaped payment of damages, but in that case liability under the Animals Act 1971 was established.  In Breeden v Lampard, an unreported case from 1985, the defendant's horse kicked out when it was approached from behind.  In that case liability under the Animals Act 1971 was not established.  The court found that the defendant's horse was behaving normally.

By a majority of three to two, the House of Lords agreed with the Court of Appeal, preferring the Cummings interpretation.

Effect
Mirvahedy did not establish a general right to compensation from the animal's owner.

Notes

House of Lords cases
2003 in case law
2003 in British law